Motocross  is a multiplayer racing video game produced by Mattel and released for its Intellivision video game system in 1983. The players each control a motocross bike in a race to the finish line.

Gameplay
Players can set the gameplay to normal direction or reverse direction. Gravity affects the gameplay resulting in bikes that accelerate, skid and jump realistically.

Legacy	
The game appeared on Microsoft's now-defunct Game Room service.

References

External links
 Motocross at Intellivision Lives

1983 video games
Intellivision games
Intellivision-only games
Mattel video games
Motorcycle video games
Video games developed in the United States